Qutuni (Aymara qutu heap, pile, -ni a suffix to indicate ownership, "the one with a heap", Hispanicized spelling Cutune) is a mountain in the Andes of southern Peru, about  high. It is situated in the Puno Region, Puno Province, San Antonio District. Qutuni lies northwest of the mountain Wankarani.

References

Mountains of Puno Region
Mountains of Peru